Mehdi Essadiq (born 31 May 1986) is a Moroccan triathlete. He competed in the men's event at the 2020 Summer Olympics.

References

External links
 

1986 births
Living people
Moroccan male triathletes
Olympic triathletes of Morocco
Triathletes at the 2020 Summer Olympics
Place of birth missing (living people)
21st-century Moroccan people